Beit Hanan is a moshav in central Israel. Located around two kilometers west of Ness Ziona, it falls under the jurisdiction of Gan Raveh Regional Council.

History

Beit Hanan founded during the Hanukkah holiday of 1929 by Jewish immigrants from Bulgaria, Beit Hanan was the first Jewish agricultural community to be established after the 1929 Palestine riots. The name is taken from the Bible, specifically (1 Kings 4:9). According to a census conducted in 1931 by the British Mandate authorities, Beit Hanan had a population of 178 inhabitants, in 50 houses.

In 2007, Beit Hanan had  of farmland. The main economic branches are eggs, orchards (pecan, citrus, avocado, mango, anona and olives) and greenhouses (flowers, vegetables and seedlings). The moshav also has banquet facilities on the grounds of a historic home. 

A Greek-inscribed mosaic floor was discovered within the boundaries of the moshav.

Gallery

Beginning

Now

References

External links

Official website

Bulgarian-Jewish culture in Israel
Moshavim
Populated places in Central District (Israel)
Populated places established in 1929
1929 establishments in Mandatory Palestine